"Throwing It All Away" is the seventh track on the 1986 album Invisible Touch by Genesis. It was the second single taken from the album in the United States, reaching No. 4 on the Billboard Hot 100 in October 1986, as well as No. 1 on Billboard's Adult Contemporary chart the Album Rock Tracks chart. It was the last single released from the album in the UK in June 1987, reaching No. 22. The working title was "Zephyr and Zeppo".

The song is a soft rock ballad structured around a guitar riff by Mike Rutherford, who also wrote the lyrics. The U.S. single included an edited version of the instrumental "Do the Neurotic" as the B-side; the UK edition featured the track "I'd Rather Be You".

Live performances
"Throwing It All Away" was performed live during the Invisible Touch, The Way We Walk, Calling All Stations and Turn It On Again tours; aside from the 1986 leg of the Invisible Touch tour, the song was transposed to a lower key to accommodate Collins' deepening voice (or Ray Wilson's deeper voice in the case of the Calling All Stations tour).

The song was also performed live on the 2018 North American and Latin American legs of Collins' solo Not Dead Yet Tour.

A live version appears on the CDs of The Way We Walk, Volume One: The Shorts and Live Over Europe 2007 and the When in Rome 2007 DVD.

During the intro and just before the end of the live performances, Collins would engage in call and response with the audience using nonsense language. Predominantly Collins would chant "Deeee Da Daaayyyyy" and the audience would in turn reply.

Music video
A music video for the song was composed of soundcheck footage and shots of the band travelling while on their Invisible Touch Tour of North America, much of which was filmed by Collins on his 1985 Sony Handycam, mostly filmed in Toronto (Exhibition Stadium) and Detroit (Joe Louis Arena). It is featured on their DVD The Video Show.

Reception
Billboard called it a "dance ballad" that sounds a lot like "a cheerier version" of Collins' earlier single "Take Me Home."   In Billboard magazine's Critics' Choice at the end of 1986, Kim Freeman chose the song as No. 7 in his top ten countdown, describing it as "a rare ballad that isn't too sappy to enjoy".  Cash Box called it "romantic and wistful."

Stevie Chick, writing for The Guardian in 2014, called the song a "genuinely affecting ballad" but observed its similarity to Collins' solo work, stating it "could have easily fitted on his solo albums".

In his assessment of the song for AllMusic, François Couture claimed: "This love song featured heartfelt vocals, a simple piano accompaniment, and Mike Rutherford's trademark rhythm guitar, plus a very catchy chorus. Nothing striking, but all the elements came together nicely and adult contemporary radio stations played it extensively."

Track listing

7": Virgin / GENS 5 (UK) 
 "Throwing It All Away" – 3:41
 "I'd Rather Be You" – 3:57

7": Atlantic / 7-89372 (US) 
 "Throwing It All Away" – 3:41
 "Do The Neurotic" (Edit) – 5:21

12": Virgin / GENS 5–12 (UK) 
 "Throwing It All Away" (live)
 "I'd Rather Be You"
 "Invisible Touch" (live)

 Also released on MC (GENSC5)
 Live tracks recorded at The Forum, Los Angeles, 1986

Personnel 
 Phil Collins – vocals, drums, percussion
 Tony Banks – keyboards
 Mike Rutherford – electric guitars, bass guitar

Release history

Charts

References

1986 singles
Genesis (band) songs
1980s ballads
Songs written by Tony Banks (musician)
Songs written by Mike Rutherford
Songs written by Phil Collins
Song recordings produced by Hugh Padgham
Virgin Records singles
Atlantic Records singles